Unionville Village Historic District is a national historic district located at Unionville in East Marlborough Township, Chester County, Pennsylvania. It encompasses 69 contributing buildings in the village of Unionville. It includes a variety of brick, stone, and frame residences the earliest of which is dated to about 1750.  Notable buildings include Unionville Academy (1834), country store (c. 1875), Union Hotel (1834), Cross Keys Inn (1751), Unionville Saddle Shop (1887), Unionville Hall (1849–50), Grange Hall (1845; originally the Friends Meetinghouse), and Green Lawn Seminary.

It was added to the National Register of Historic Places in 1979.

References

Historic districts on the National Register of Historic Places in Pennsylvania
Historic districts in Chester County, Pennsylvania
National Register of Historic Places in Chester County, Pennsylvania